Nothing Gold Can Stay may refer to:

"Nothing Gold Can Stay" (poem), a poem by American poet Robert Frost
Nothing Gold Can Stay (album), a 1999 album by New Found Glory
Nothing Gold Can Stay (short story collection), a 2013 short story collection by Ron Rash
Episode 11 of Containment (TV series) in 2016, named after the Frost poem
Nothing Gold Can Stay (TV series), a 2017 Chinese television series